Diego Wolf (30 August 1934 – 23 December 2010) was an Argentine water polo player. He competed in the men's tournament at the 1960 Summer Olympics.

References

External links
 

1934 births
2010 deaths
Argentine male water polo players
Olympic water polo players of Argentina
Water polo players at the 1960 Summer Olympics
People from Aurich